Tatsuo Takahashi (November 23, 1928 – October 10, 2001) was a Japanese politician from Date, Hokkaido. He was twice a member of the House of Representatives of Japan from the multi-member constituency Hokkaido's 4th district (1979–1990, 1993–1996). In his last term, he served alongside Yukio Hatoyama, Tadamasa Kodaira and Shōichi Watanabe. He was a member of the Liberal Democratic Party of Japan.

Japanese politicians
People from Date, Hokkaido
1928 births
2001 deaths